The Bosnian Cultural Center (Bosnian, Croatian and Serbian: Bosanski kulturni centar / Босански културни центар - BKC) is a national cultural center located in Sarajevo, Bosnia and Herzegovina. The center was established in 1966 and is housed in a former synagogue built in the Moorish Revival architectural style. The center is run as a public institution by the Sarajevo Canton.

History 

In 1923 the Jewish Municipality of Sarajevo drew out plans to build a monumental synagogue in the city, at that time the capital of the Drinska banovina, which was home to one of the largest Jewish communities in the Kingdom of Yugoslavia. The preliminary plans outlined the municipality's desire for the synagogue to be the largest in Southeastern Europe. The motive behind the project was the fact that none of the city's existing synagogues could hold more than a fifth of the total Jewish congregation. A project board formed by the municipality and headed by notable Jewish industrialist, Avram Majer Altarac, purchased the land for 100,000 CHF, with construction beginning in 1926. The famous Croatian Art Nouveau architect Rudolf Lubinski was hired to design the building. His concept of a lavish Moorish Revivalist design, which was prevalent in the architecture of Sarajevo since Austro-Hungarian times was green lighted, with construction being completed in 1930. The synagogue, known as the Il Kal Grande, was officially opened on 14 May 1931.

After the Nazi invasion of Yugoslavia in 1941 and the establishment of the puppet Independent State of Croatia, severe racial laws were implemented by the occupying forced which lead to the desecration and looting of the synagogue in the first months of the occupation. After the end of the war the Jewish Municipality, whose community was desecrated during the holocaust with over 90 percent being murdered in concentration camps, donated the building to the city of Sarajevo. In 1965 architect Ivan Štraus was chosen to head renovation work on the building, which was reestablished as the Đuro Đaković Center, named after Yugoslav communist and revolutionary Đuro Đaković. The center contained a state of the art movie theatre, numerous workshops, classrooms and an art gallery.

In 1993, during the Siege of Sarajevo, the center was symbolically renamed the Bosnian Cultural Center. During subsequent years it has become the premier cultural center in Bosnia and Herzegovina, hosting weekly concerts, theatre productions and film screenings. It is one of the venues of the Sarajevo Film Festival, Sarajevo Jazz Festival and the main venue for Juventafest. It was expanded and renovated in 2015. Further renovations are planned for 2019.

References

External links
 Official website

1931 establishments in Yugoslavia
Cultural centers
Art museums and galleries in Bosnia and Herzegovina
Theatres in Bosnia and Herzegovina
Culture in Sarajevo
Buildings and structures in Sarajevo